Kedibone Margret Lebea-Olaiya is a South African politician who has represented the African National Congress (ANC) in the Limpopo Provincial Legislature since 2019. She was elected to her seat in the 2019 general election, ranked 18th on the ANC's party list. She is active in the ANC's Peter Mokaba regional branch in Capricorn District and in June 2022 was elected to a four-year term on the Provincial Executive Committee of the party's Limpopo branch.

References

External links 

 

Year of birth missing (living people)
Living people
Members of the Limpopo Provincial Legislature
African National Congress politicians
21st-century South African politicians
21st-century South African women politicians
Women members of provincial legislatures of South Africa